North Staffordshire (formally the Northern division of Staffordshire) was a county constituency in the county of Staffordshire.  It returned two Members of Parliament (MPs) to the House of Commons of the Parliament of the United Kingdom, elected by the bloc vote system.

History

The constituency was created by the Reform Act 1832 for the 1832 general election, and abolished by the Redistribution of Seats Act 1885 for the 1885 general election.

Boundaries
1832–1868: The Hundreds of Pirehill, Totmonslow and North Offlow.

1868–1885: The Hundreds of Totmonslow and Pirehill North.

Members of Parliament

Election results

Elections in the 1830s

Elections in the 1840s

Elections in the 1850s
Egerton's resignation caused a by-election.

 

 

Adderley was appointed Vice-President of the Committee of the Privy Council for Education, requiring a by-election.

Elections in the 1860s

Elections in the 1870s

Adderley was appointed President of the Board of Trade, requiring a by-election.

Adderley was elevated to the peerage, becoming Lord Norton, and causing a by-election.

Elections in the 1880s

References

Parliamentary constituencies in Staffordshire (historic)
Constituencies of the Parliament of the United Kingdom established in 1832
Constituencies of the Parliament of the United Kingdom disestablished in 1885